Chiharu Araki (born March 1, 1982) is a Japanese politician who is currently serving as a member of the Tokyo Metropolitan Assembly and as the leader of the Tomin First no Kai political party.

Araki was born in Kumamoto Prefecture and graduated from the law school of Kurume University. She previously served as the secretary of Yuriko Koike, the current Governor of Tokyo.

References 

Japanese politicians
1982 births
Living people